Bagrat III may refer to:

 Bagrat III of Georgia, King in 1008–1014
 Bagrat III of Imereti, King in 1510–1565